Rugby Club d'Arras is a French rugby union team, from Arras. They currently play at Fédérale 2 (2016).

Arras
Arras
Sport in Pas-de-Calais